Slippy McGee is a 1948 American crime film directed by Albert H. Kelley, written by Jerome Gruskin and Norman S. Hall, and starring Don "Red" Barry, Dale Evans, Tom Brown, Harry Cheshire, James Seay and Murray Alper. It was released on January 15, 1948 by Republic Pictures.

Plot

After he and a pair of accomplices, Al and Red, pull a $50,000 diamond heist, Slippy McGee separates from them and plans to hide out for a while in Middleton, a small town. A motorcycle-riding priest, Father Shanley, gives him a lift, then expresses his gratitude after Slippy saves a young boy from being hit by a truck.

In town, nurse Mary Hunter is asked by Dr. Moore to treat the newcomer's injuries. Slippy's monogram being noticed in his hat, he makes up the name "Steve Martin" on the spot. Mary's attentions to the patient stirs jealousy in suitor Tom Eustis, the richest man in town. Mary's rejection of his proposal infuriates Eustis, who sets out to ruin her father in business.

Al and Red turn up in town and decide to rob the bank. Suspicion falls on Slippy, who confronts his former partners and ends up killing Red in self-defense. When he decides to turn himself in to the law, Mary and others from Middleton say they'll vouch for his character and expect his return.

Cast   
Don "Red" Barry as Slippy McGee 
Dale Evans as Mary Hunter
Tom Brown as Father Shanley
Harry Cheshire as Dr. Moore 
James Seay as Thomas Eustis
Murray Alper as Red
Dick Elliott as Fred Appelby
Maude Eburne as Mrs. Dexter
Raymond Largay as John Hunter
Eddie Acuff as Charlie
Michael Carr as Al
Georgie Nokes as Tommy

References

External links 
 

1948 films
American crime films
1948 crime films
Republic Pictures films
Films directed by Albert H. Kelley
Films based on American novels
American black-and-white films
1940s English-language films
1940s American films